Qaderabad (also Romanized as Qāderābād; also known as Qādīrābād) is a village in Jamrud Rural District, in the Central District of Torbat-e Jam County, Razavi Khorasan Province, Iran. At the 2006 census, its population was 718, in 149 families.

References 

Populated places in Torbat-e Jam County